Visar Bekaj (born 24 May 1997) is a Kosovan professional footballer who plays as a goalkeeper for Tirana in Kategoria Superiore and Kosovo national team.

Club career

Prishtina

2019–20 season
On 27 June 2019, Bekaj commenced his fifth season with a draw in 2019–20 UEFA Europa League preliminary round match against Gibraltarian side St Joseph's after being named in the starting line-up.

Failure to join with 1899 Hoffenheim
On 4 July 2019, Prishtina through a communiqué stated that Bekaj, most likely in Gibraltar against St Joseph's has played his last official match with Prishtina and is soon expected to move to 1899 Hoffenheim. On 4 September 2019, Bota Sot confirms that Bekaj's transfer to 1899 Hoffenheim has failed after the German club request in TMS system to Prishtina was missing.

Return to Prishtina
Bekaj returned to Football Superleague of Kosovo side Prishtina, On 13 September 2019, he played the first game after the return against Llapi after being named in the starting line-up.

Tirana
On 29 August 2020, Bekaj signed a three-year contract with Kategoria Superiore club Tirana. His debut with Tirana came on 1 October in the 2020–21 UEFA Europa League play-off round against Young Boys after being named in the starting line-up.

International career

Youth career and first senior call-up
In December 2012, Bekaj received a call-up from Albania U17 for a selection camp in Pristina, Kosovo from 3–4 December 2012. On 7 October 2015, he received a call-up from Kosovo for the friendly match against Equatorial Guinea. His debut with Kosovo came on 13 November in a friendly match against Albania after coming on as a substitute at 89th minute in place of captain Samir Ujkani.

Return to youth team
On 21 March 2017, Bekaj received a call-up from Kosovo U21 for a 2019 UEFA European Under-21 Championship qualification match against Republic of Ireland U21, and made his debut after being named in the starting line-up.

Honours

Club 
Tirana
Kategoria Superiore: 2021–22
Albanian Supercup: 2022

References

External links

1997 births
Living people
Sportspeople from Pristina
Kosovan footballers
Kosovo international footballers
Kosovo under-21 international footballers
Albanian footballers
Albania youth international footballers
Association football goalkeepers
Football Superleague of Kosovo players
FC Prishtina players
Kategoria Superiore players
KF Tirana players